,, is a  lake that provides water for the workings of the Canal de Briare.

Hugues Cosnier, designer of the canal, planned a  waterway from the River Trezée to the Gazonne.  The Gazonne acted as a reservoir.

References

Lakes of Centre-Val de Loire